The 20th Canadian Parliament was in session from 6 September 1945, until 30 April 1949. The membership was set by the 1945 federal election on 11 June 1945, and it changed only somewhat due to resignations and by-elections until it was dissolved prior to the 1949 election.

It was controlled by a Liberal Party minority first under Prime Minister William Lyon Mackenzie King and the 16th Canadian Ministry, and later a majority under Prime Minister Louis St. Laurent and the 17th Canadian Ministry.  The Official Opposition was the newly named Progressive Conservative Party, led first by John Bracken and later by George Drew.

The Speaker was Gaspard Fauteux.  See also List of Canadian electoral districts 1933-1947 for a list of the ridings in this parliament.

In this parliament, the Co-operative Commonwealth Federation, led by M. J. Coldwell, overtook the Social Credit as third largest party.

There were five sessions of the 20th Parliament.

List of members

Following is a full list of members of the twentieth Parliament listed first by province, then by electoral district.

Electoral districts denoted by an asterisk (*) indicates that district was represented by two members.

Alberta

British Columbia

Manitoba

New Brunswick

Nova Scotia

Ontario

Prince Edward Island

Quebec

Saskatchewan

Yukon

By-elections

References

Canadian parliaments
1945 establishments in Canada
1949 disestablishments in Canada
1945 in Canada
1946 in Canada
1947 in Canada
1948 in Canada
1949 in Canada